Max Melbourne (born 24 October 1998) is an English professional footballer who plays for Morecambe, as a left back.

Career
Melbourne joined West Bromwich Albion at the age of 9. He moved on loan to Ross County in January 2018, making his senior debut on 10 March 2018. Melbourne subsequently joined Partick Thistle on a six-month loan in July 2018. His loan deal ended early, in November 2018, having scored one goal in five games. On 2 September 2019 he signed a loan deal at Lincoln City lasting until 6 January 2020.

Melbourne's deal at Lincoln was made a -year permanent contract on 10 January 2020.

On 1 February 2021, he joined Walsall on loan for the remainder of the 2020–21 season. He scored on his debut for the club, at home to Mansfield Town on 9 February 2021.

He returned to the Lincoln City team the following season, starting the season opening against Gillingham. On 31 August 2021 he joined Stevenage on loan until January. He was recalled by Lincoln City on 10 January 2022. He scored his first goal for Lincoln on 22 January 2022, an injury time header against Plymouth Argyle. In May 2022 it was announced that he would leave the club at the end of the season, and in June 2022 it was announced that he would sign for Morecambe on 1 July.

Career statistics

References

1998 births
Living people
English footballers
West Bromwich Albion F.C. players
Ross County F.C. players
Partick Thistle F.C. players
Lincoln City F.C. players
Walsall F.C. players
Stevenage F.C. players
Morecambe F.C. players
Scottish Professional Football League players
Association football fullbacks
English Football League players